Oitylo, known as "Βίτσουλο", pronounced Vitsoulo, in the native Maniot dialect, is a village and a former municipality in Laconia, Peloponnese, Greece. Since the 2011 local government reform it is part of the municipality East Mani, of which it is a municipal unit. It is one of the oldest towns in the Mani Peninsula. It was mentioned in the Iliad by Homer as Oetylus, as part of Menelaus' kingdom. In the Middle Ages, Oitylo grew to become the most important town in Messenian Mani. The only town in Mani that rivaled Oitylos in numbers of pirates was Skoutari. Now Areopoli has taken Oitylo's place as the most important town in Laconian Mani.  Areopoli was also the seat of the municipality of Oitylo, which is located on the western half of the Mani Peninsula in the extreme southwestern part of Laconia. It has a land area of 218.582 km² and a population of 3,515 inhabitants (2011 census). There are 91 villages in the municipality. The largest of these are Areópoli (pop. 888), Pyrgos Dirou (246) and Oítylo (224).

Subdivisions
The municipal unit Oitylo is subdivided into the following communities:
Alika
Ano Boularioi
Areopoli
Dryalos
Dhry
Germa
Gerolimenas
Kareas
Kelefa
Koita
Kounos
Kryoneri
Mina
Neo Oitylo
Oitylo
Pyrgos Dirou
Tsikkalia
Vachos
Vatheia

Historical population

Province
The province of Oitylo was one of the provinces of the Laconia Prefecture. Its territory corresponded with that of the current municipal unit Oitylo. It was abolished in 2006.

See also
List of settlements in Laconia

References

External links
Official website 
.

Populated places in Laconia
Populated places in the Mani Peninsula
Provinces of Greece
East Mani